Edward H. Janssen was a German American immigrant, teacher, and pioneer.  He was the 2nd State Treasurer of Wisconsin.

Biography
Born in Germany in 1815, Janssen moved to Mequon, Wisconsin in 1840. He was a delegate to the first Wisconsin Constitutional Convention in 1846 and served as Treasurer from 1852 to 1856. In 1853, he helped to build the Concordia Mill, now listed on the National Register of Historic Places. Later, he moved to Cedarburg, Wisconsin and became Superintendent of Schools of Ozaukee County, Wisconsin. He held the position until his death in 1877.

References

German emigrants to the United States
People from Cedarburg, Wisconsin
People from Mequon, Wisconsin
State treasurers of Wisconsin
1815 births
1877 deaths
19th-century American politicians